Lluçà is a municipality in the comarca of Osona in Catalonia, Spain. This village, prominent because of its monastery, gives its name to the surrounding natural comarca of Lluçanès.

In 2015, the municipality voted to join a proposed new comarca of Lluçanès, but the plan was put on hold due to insufficient support.

History
Lluçà was part of the County of Roussillon area and governed by the Counts of Roussillon during the 6th and 7th centuries. Throughout the end of the 8th century and the middle of the twelfth century, Lluçà was governed by various Counts of Barcelona.

Demography

Sites of interest
Remains of the Castle of Lluçà
Romanesque hermitage of Sant Vicenç del Castell. A circular building with a hemispherical vault and small apse. Documented since 988, the present structure dates from the 11th and 12th centuries. 
Monastery of Santa Maria de Lluçà. A Romanesque church with Gothic murals.

References

 Panareda Clopés, Josep Maria; Rios Calvet, Jaume; Rabella Vives, Josep Maria (1989). Guia de Catalunya, Barcelona: Caixa de Catalunya.  (Spanish).  (Catalan).

External links

Town website
 Government data pages 

Municipalities in Osona